The van Genuchten–Gupta model is an inverted S-curve applicable to crop yield and soil salinity relations.

Equation

The mathematical expression is:

 Y = Ym / [ 1 + {C / C50} P ]

where Y = yield, Ym = maximum yield of the model, C = salt concentration of the soil, C50 = C value at 50% yield, P = an exponent to be found by optimization and maximizing the model's goodness of fit to the data.

In the figure: Ym = 3.1, C50 = 12.4, P = 3.75

Alternative one

As an alternative, the logistic S-function can be used.

The mathematical expression is:

 Y^ = 1 / { 1 + e (A.XC + B) }

where:

 Y^ = (Y - Yn) / (Ym - Yn)

with Y =Yield, Yn = minimum Y, Ym = maximum Y, X = salt concentration of the soil, while A, B and C are constants to be determined by optimization and maximizing the model's goodness of fit to the data.

If the minimum Yn=0 then the expression can be simplified to:

 Y = Ym / { 1 + e (A.XC + B) }

In the figure: Ym = 3.43, Yn = 0.47, A = 0.112, B = -3.16, C = 1.42.

Alternative two

The third degree or cubic regression also offers a useful alternative.

The equation reads:

 Y = A.X3 + B.X2 + C.X + D

with Y =Yield, X = salt concentration of the soil, while A, B, C and D are constants to be determined by the regression.

In the figure: A = 0.0017, B = 0.0604, C=0.3874, D = 2.3788. These values were calculated with Microsoft Excel

The curvature is more pronounced than in the other models.

See also
Maas–Hoffman model

References

Soil science
Mathematical modeling
Crops